Simona-Mirela Miculescu (born 4 July 1959) is a senior Romanian diplomat, currently serving as Permanent Delegate of Romania to UNESCO, with the rank of Ambassador Extraordinary and Plenipotentiary. Prior to this she was Representative of the UN Secretary-General and Head of the UN Office in Belgrade, and before that, the Permanent Representative of Romania to the United Nations in New York. She also served as Foreign Policy Advisor to the President of Romania, and is the first woman in Romania's diplomatic history to be granted the rank of Ambassador.

Education
Miculescu graduated from the Babeş-Bolyai University in Cluj-Napoca with a BA in French and English Literature and Language in 1982. She took a Public Relations Professional Certificate at George Washington University, Washington DC (1997). She has a Ph.D. magna cum laudae in French Literature (Babeş-Bolyai University, 1999). Other professional training includes a Diplomatic Course at the Institute of International Relations at The University of Leeds, UK, and a Senior Executive Seminar at the George C. Marshall Center for European Security Studies in Garmisch-Partenkirchen, Germany (2002).

Career
Previously, Miculescu was the Director of the Department for Communication and Public Diplomacy within the Romanian Ministry of Foreign Affairs. During her diplomatic career, she served twice as Spokesperson for the Romanian Ministry of Foreign Affairs, twice as Senior Media Advisor to the Minister (in 1993 and 1999), Director of the Press Department within the Romanian Ministry of Foreign Affairs (1994), Press Secretary of the Romanian Embassy in Washington D.C. (1994–1998), and as Senior Public Information Officer at the Mission of the Organization for Security and Cooperation in Europe (OSCE) in Kosovo (1999–2000).

Between 2000 and 2004, she served as Foreign Policy Advisor to the President of Romania (during President Ion Iliescu's second term), becoming the first woman in Romania's diplomatic history to be granted the rank of Ambassador.

Between 2006 and 2007, as part of BearingPoint, she acted as Senior Advisor for Public Outreach to the Government of Iraq in Baghdad.

Academic background
She has a PhD in Literature, has been a professor of International Public Relations at two Romanian universities, and has published of several books and tens of articles. In Romania, she is known as an experts in the area of management of International Public Relations and developed the first curriculum on this topic, which is now used in several Romanian universities.

Affiliations
 founding member (1995–present) and president of the Romanian Public Relations Association  (2003–2005)
 founding member of the Global Alliance for Public Relations and Communication Management (2000–present)
 founding member of Casa NATO, Bucharest (2002–present)
 founding member of UNRocks band (2012-present)
 member of the “George C. Marshall Association of Romania” (2002–present)
 honorary member of the English Speaking Union – Romania (2003–present)
 founding member and board member of the “Friends of the Minovici Museums Association” (2005–present)
 member of the International Association of Permanent Representatives to the UN (2008–present)
 member of the Washington Women Diplomat Association, Washington DC (1995–1999)
 member of the National Press Club, Washington DC (1995–1999)
 member of the Public Relations Society of America (1996–2008)
 member of the International Public Relations Association (2004–2008)

Honors and mentions
 The National Order “Diplomatic Merit” in the rank of Chevalier, granted by the President of Romania, Mr. Traian Basescu, April 2007
 The National Order of the Star of Italian Solidarity in the rank of Grand Official, granted by the President of The Italian Republic, Mr. Carlo Azeglio Ciampi, June 2004
 “Medal for special merits within the process of the European and Euro-Atlantic Integration of Romania”, granted by the “George C. Marshall” Association of Romania, February 2003
 The “Order of Rio Branco” in the rank of Commander, granted by the President of the Federative Republic of Brazil, Mr. Fernando Cardoso, May 2002
 The National Order “Star of Romania” in the rank of Chevalier, granted by the President of Romania, Mr. Ion Iliescu, December 2002
 Included by Capital Magazine in the “Top 100 Most Successful Women in Romania” – 2005, 2006, 2007 and 2008
 Included by the Capital Magazine in the “Top 50 Most Successful Women in Romania” – 2004
 Awarded by Avantaje Magazine as “Woman of the Year 2008 – for the promotion of the image of Romania” – 2008

References

1959 births
Living people
People from Satu Mare
Romanian women diplomats
Romanian presidential advisors
Romanian public relations people
Permanent Representatives of Romania to the United Nations
Romanian women ambassadors